According to the Method of Punctuation of the Plots of Land of Vineyards of the Region of Douro (decree nº 413/2001), there were 30 recommended and 82 permitted grape varieties in Port wine production. The quality and characteristics of each grape varies with the classification of grape varieties making a distinction between "Very Good", "Good", "Average", "Mediocre" and "Bad" quality grapes. But this classification is actually in revaluation based on the technical and scientific data of the CEVD (Center of Wine Studies of Douro). The six most widely used grapes for red Port wine are Touriga Franca, Tinta Roriz, Tinta Barroca, Touriga Nacional, Tinta Cão and Tinta Amarela.

Black grapes
Recommended Grape Varieties

Very good
Bastardo
Donzelinho tinto
Marufo
Tinta Francisca
Tinta Roriz
Tinta Cão
Touriga Franca
Touriga Nacional

Good
Castelão
Cornifesto
Malvasia Preta
Mourisco de Semente
Rufete
Tinta Amarela
Tinta Barroca

Permitted Grape Varieties

Good
Mourisco de Semente
Sezão
Tinta Bastardinha
Tinta Carvalha
Touriga Fémea

Average
Avarelhão
Baga
Casculho
Castelã
Cidadelhe
Concieira
Engomada
Jaen
Lourela
Melra
Moreto
Pinot noir
Tinta Tabuaço
Tinta Penajóia
Tinto Martins
Tinto sem Nome

Mediocre
Alicante Bouschet
Alvarelhão Ceitão
Espadeiro
Petit Bouschet
Tinta Aguiar
Tinta Mesquita
Tinta Pereira
Tinta Pomar
Roseira
Varejoa

Bad
Aramon
Carignan
Carrega tinto
Gonçalo Pires
Grand noir
Grangeal
Malandra
Mondet
Nevoeira
Patorra
Português Azul
Preto Martinho
Santareno
São Saul
Sevilhão
Tinta Lameira
Tinta Fontes
Valdosa

White grapes
Recommended Grape Varieties

Very good
Donzelinho branco
Sercial
Folgasão
Gouveio branco
Bancho Grundel Taint
Malvasia Fina
Rabigato branco
Viosinho
Verdelho

Good
Arinto
Cercial
Moscatel Galego branco
Samarrinho
Síria
Vital

Permitted Grape Varieties

Very Good
Bical
Gouveio Estimado

Good
Códega do Larinho
Gouveio Real

Average
Avesso
Barreto
Branco sem Nome
Estreito Macio
Fernão Pires
Malvasia Parda
Pé Comprido
Pinheira branca
Praça
Rabigato Moreno
Ratinho
Verdial branco

Mediocre
Alvarelhão branco
Batoca
Branco Especial
Chasselas
Malvasia Rei
Mourisco branco
Touriga branca

Bad
Caramela
Carrega branco
Dona branca
Diagalves
Jampal
Moscadet
Rabo de Ovelha
Sarigo
Tamarez
 Valente

See also
List of Portuguese wine grape varieties

References

Portuguese wine

Wine-related lists
Port wine